Sharon Joy Grierson (born 4 May 1951 in Newcastle, New South Wales) was educated at Newcastle Teachers College, and worked as a teacher and school principal before entering politics.

Grierson became a member of the Australian Labor Party, and was elected to the Australian House of Representatives in November 2001, representing the Division of Newcastle. She was re-elected in 2004, 2007 and 2010.

However, in July 2012, Grierson announced she would not seek re-election in 2013, citing the need to attend to family and personal health problems.

She has been the only Labor MP to sign the Australian Marriage Equality Charter, and voted in favour of legislation to legalise same-sex marriage in Australia when it was presented in parliament. She also chaired the Public Accounts and Audit Committee.

She was co-convenor of the Parliamentary Friends of Dementia, a parliamentary friendship group that advocates for Australians living with dementia, their families and carers.

References

External links
Official website
Sharon Grierson on the Australian Labor Party website

1951 births
Living people
Australian Labor Party members of the Parliament of Australia
Australian headmistresses
Labor Left politicians
Members of the Australian House of Representatives
Members of the Australian House of Representatives for Newcastle
People from Newcastle, New South Wales
Women members of the Australian House of Representatives
21st-century Australian women politicians
21st-century Australian politicians
20th-century Australian educators
20th-century women educators